Thermal battery may refer to:

 Thermal battery, a heat storage device
 Molten salt battery, a device for generating electricity